Škvorecký may refer to:

 Josef Škvorecký, (1924–2012), Czech writer
 26314 Škvorecký, an asteroid